The 2014–15 season was Plymouth Argyle's 88th in the Football League and ninth in the fourth division of English football.

First team squad

Last updated: 26 June 2015Source:Green Army 12

Pre-season

Matches

Last updated: 29 October 2014Source:Greens on Screen

League Two

League table

Results by round

Matches

	 

Last updated:2 May 2015Source:Greens on Screen

Play-off semi-finals

Matches

FA Cup

The draw for the first round was made on 28 October 2014 at 7pm. Plymouth Argyle were drawn at home to AFC Fylde of the Conference North.

The second round draw took place on Monday 10 November with Plymouth Argyle being drawn an away fixture against either Crewe or Sheffield United. Their replay is due to be played on the Tuesday 18 November.

Matches

Last updated: 15 November 2014Source: pafc.co.uk]
Source: pafc.co.uk]

League Cup

The draw for the first round was made on 17 June 2014 at 10am. Plymouth Argyle were drawn at home to Leyton Orient.

Matches

Last updated: 1 November 2014Source:Greens on Screen

Football League Trophy

Matches

Last updated: 12 October 2014Source:Greens on Screen

Appearance / Goals / Disciplinary 

Last updated: 26 June 2015Source:Green Army 12

Transfers

In

Out

Loans in

Loans out

References

Plymouth Argyle F.C. seasons
Plymouth Argyle